The Rebellion of the Brides is a 1984 Uzbek comedy film based on an eponymous play by the Uzbek writer Said Ahmad and directed by Melis Abzalov. Kelinlar qoʻzgvoloni is one of the most critically acclaimed Uzbek films of the Soviet period. Like Melis Abzalov's previous film Suyunchi, Kelinlar qoʻzgʻoloni tells the story of an authoritative grandmother.

Plot
Farmon bibi (played by Tursunoy Jaʼfarova) is a wise and loving, but strict mother who lives with the families of her seven sons in one house. Nigora, the wife of her youngest son, rebels against Farmon Bibi and the other wives sympathize with her. Toward the end of the film, Farmon bibi changes her attitude and gives in to the demands of her daughters-in-law.

References

External links
 

1984 films
Soviet comedy films
Uzbek-language films
Soviet-era Uzbek films
Uzbekfilm films
Uzbekistani comedy films
Soviet films based on plays
1984 comedy films